Vlad Negoitescu (born July 15, 1991) is a Romanian professional basketball player for CSU Asesoft Ploiești of the Romanian League.

References

1991 births
Living people
CSU Asesoft Ploiești players
Sportspeople from Ploiești
Romanian men's basketball players
Centers (basketball)